Opequon Golf Club, also known as the Stonebridge Golf Club and Martinsburg Golf Club, is a historic country club clubhouse located at Martinsburg, Berkeley County, West Virginia. The clubhouse was built in 1922, and is a one-story, Adirondack Lodge Style stone building with a wraparound porch on the north and west sides. It has a steep gable roof with a chimney at the west end. The porches have hip roofs and feature exposed rafter ends and stone columns.  It sits on a raised basement.  The building was added to on the east end in 1955.  West Virginia Senator Charles James Faulkner (1847 - 1929) was a founding member and served as first president of the Opequon Golf Club.

It was listed on the National Register of Historic Places in 1995.

References

External links
Stonebridge Golf Club website

American Craftsman architecture in West Virginia
Bungalow architecture in West Virginia
Clubhouses on the National Register of Historic Places in West Virginia
Buildings and structures completed in 1922
Golf clubs and courses in West Virginia
Houses in Berkeley County, West Virginia
National Register of Historic Places in Martinsburg, West Virginia